Breege is a municipality in the Vorpommern-Rügen district, in Mecklenburg-Vorpommern, Germany. The municipality consists of the villages Breege, Juliusruh, Kammin, Lobkevitz and Schmantevitz.

References

External links

Official website of Breege

Towns and villages on Rügen
Wittow